KSSO (89.3 FM, "Sonlife Radio") is a radio station broadcasting a gospel music format. Licensed to Norman, Oklahoma, United States, the station is currently owned by Family Worship Center Church, Inc.

References

External links

 http://sonlifetv.com/index.html

SSO
Gospel radio stations in the United States
SSO
Norman, Oklahoma